Eberjagd um 1500 is an outdoor sculpture by Karl Begas, installed at Fasanerieallee in Tiergarten, Berlin, Germany.

References

External links

 

Animals in art
Outdoor sculptures in Berlin
Sculptures of men in Germany
Statues in Germany
Tiergarten (park)